Town class may refer to:

 Town Class (sailboat), a class of American dory
 , a group of 21 British and Australian light cruisers
 , a group of 10 British light cruisers
 , a group of American destroyers transferred to other navies

See also
 City class (disambiguation)
 Province class (disambiguation)